Storm Center is a 1956 American film noir drama directed by Daniel Taradash. The screenplay by Taradash and Elick Moll focuses on what were at the time two very controversial subjects—Communism and book banning—and took a strong stance against censorship. The film stars Bette Davis, and was the first overtly anti-McCarthyism film to be produced in Hollywood.

Plot
Alicia Hull is a widowed small town librarian dedicated to introducing children to the joy of reading. In exchange for fulfilling her request for a children's wing, the city council asks her to withdraw the book The Communist Dream from the library's collection. When she refuses to comply with their demand, she is fired, and branded as a subversive. Especially upset by this is young Freddie Slater, a boy with a deep love of books whom Alicia has closely mentored.

Judge Robert Ellerbe feels Alicia has been treated unfairly, and calls a town meeting, hoping to rally support for her. However, ambitious attorney and aspiring politician Paul Duncan, who is dating assistant librarian Martha Lockridge, undermines those efforts by publicly revealing Alicia's past associations with organizations that turned out to be Communist fronts. Alicia notes that she resigned as soon as she found out the true nature of the organizations, but Duncan's incendiary revelations result in only a handful of people showing up to the meeting. Those who do attend express concern about being branded Communists themselves if they stand with Alicia. Upon hearing their concerns, Alicia informs the meeting that she no longer wishes to fight the city council, and wants to let the matter drop. With no opposition to her removal mounted, virtually the entire town eventually turns against Alicia.

Freddie, convinced by the opinions of others, particularly his narrow-minded father, that Alicia is a bad person, is unable to handle the resulting feelings of betrayal. He becomes increasingly fearful even of books themselves, and he begins to break down completely, culminating in his setting fire to the library. His actions cause the residents to have a change of heart, and they ask Alicia to return and supervise the construction of a new building. Alicia agrees, lamenting her earlier decision not to fight and vowing never again to allow a book to be removed from the library.

Cast
 Bette Davis as Alicia Hull
 Brian Keith as Paul Duncan
 Kim Hunter as Martha Lockridge
 Paul Kelly as Judge Robert Ellerbe
 Joe Mantell as George Slater
 Kevin Coughlin as Freddie Slater
 Sally Brophy as Laura Slater (as Sallie Brophie)
 Howard Wierum as Mayor Levering
 Curtis Cooksey as Stacey Martin
 Michael Raffetto as Edgar Greenbaum
 Joseph Kearns as Mr. Morrisey
 Edward Platt as Rev. Wilson
 Kathryn Grant as Hazel Levering 
 Howard Wendell as Sen. Bascomb

Principal production credits
 Produced by Julian Blaustein
 Original music by George Duning
 Cinematography by Burnett Guffey
 Art direction by Cary Odell
 Title design by Saul Bass

Production notes
In 1951, it was announced that Mary Pickford would return to the screen after an 18-year absence in The Library, produced by Stanley Kramer and directed by Irving Reis. The following year, she withdrew from the project, a month before filming was scheduled to begin, ostensibly due to the fact it was not a Technicolor production. Within days, Kramer signed Barbara Stanwyck to replace her, but scheduling conflicts with his new star repeatedly delayed the start of filming. Kramer eventually dropped out of the project, and it remained in limbo until Taradash decided to direct it himself with the new title.

Although set in New England, the Columbia Pictures release was filmed on location in Santa Rosa, California. It is the only film ever directed by Taradash.

The film is also notable for featuring an early poster and title sequence created by noted graphic designer Saul Bass. The opening title sequence features flames that eat away at both the face of a boy and pages from a book. The pages are from "On Liberty" by John Stuart Mill. The two pages are actually duplicates of a single page from chapter two of Mill's 1859 essay. The page contains this passage:Strange it is that men should admit the validity of the arguments for free speech but object to their being “pushed to an extreme”, not seeing that unless the reasons are good for an extreme case, they are not good for any case.While the events in the movie were largely fictional, the character played by Bette Davis was based on Ruth W. Brown, the Bartlesville, Oklahoma, librarian, and her struggle with the county commission over communist literature.

Critical reception
In his review in The New York Times, Bosley Crowther felt that "the purpose and courage of the men who made this film not only are to be commended, but also deserve concrete rewards. They have opened a subject that is touchy and urgent in contemporary life...[They] put a stern thought in this film, which is that the fears and suspicions of our age are most likely to corrupt and scar the young...However, the thesis is much better than the putting forth of it. The visualization of this drama is clumsy and abrupt...Mr. Blaustein and Mr. Taradash have tried nobly, but they have failed to develop a film that whips up dramatic excitement or flames with passion in support of its theme." Of Bette Davis, he wrote "[She gives] a fearless and forceful performance as the middle-aged widowed librarian who stands by her principles. Miss Davis makes the prim, but stalwart, lady human and credible."

Time wrote that the film "makes reading seem nearly as risky a habit as dope...[It] is paved and repaved with good intentions; its heart is insistently in the right place; its leading characters are motivated by the noblest of sentiments. All that Writer-Director Taradash forgot was to provide a believable story."

In the Saturday Review, Arthur Knight wrote that the film "comes to grips with its central problem with a forthright honesty and integrity...It may be that in fashioning the story, the authors have made their film a bit too pat, a bit too glib, a bit too easy in its articulation of the various points of view expressed. Bette Davis's enlightened liberalism sounds at times as dangerously smug and self-righteous as the benighted politicos and anti-intellectuals who oppose her."

The National Legion of Decency stated the "propaganda film offers a warped, over-simplified emotional solution to the complex problems of civil liberties in American life". Daily Variety responded to the Legion by suggesting "It's almost impossible to over-dramatize human liberty whether it's a depiction of Patrick Henry...or a librarian sacrificing her reputation rather than her democratic principles."

Time Out London calls the film a "didactic, laborious piece".

TV Guide wrote that "While the film was forthright in its attempt to deal with censorship, the execution was dismal. The sudden alteration in the town's beliefs is just too nonsensical to accept. Davis, however, is quite convincing as the principled librarian, but there just isn't enough of a story to complement her performance."

Of it, Davis herself said "I was not overjoyed with the finished film...I had far higher hopes for it. The basic lack was the casting of the boy. He was not a warm, loving type of child...His relationship with the librarian was totally unemotional, and, therefore, robbed the film of its most important factor, [since] their relationship...was the nucleus of the script."

Accolades
In 1957, Storm Center was awarded the Prix de Chevalier da la Barre at the Cannes Film Festival, where it was cited as "this year's film which best helps freedom of expression and tolerance".

Home media
It was released on DVD March 4, 2011. The Blu-ray was released by Imprint Films on September 9, 2022.

See also
List of American films of 1956
Hollywood on Trial - 1976 Oscar-nominated documentary featured on the Blu-ray edition
Bibliophobia

References

External links
 
 BFI
 Imprint Films trailer

1956 films
1956 drama films
American black-and-white films
American drama films
Columbia Pictures films
Films scored by George Duning
Films about McCarthyism
Films about librarians
Films shot in California
Films set in libraries
1956 directorial debut films
1950s English-language films
1950s American films
Films about censorship